Robinson Ekspeditionen 2013 is the 15th season of the Danish reality-show Robinson Ekspeditionen.

Contestants in Robinson Ekspeditionen 2013 

 Team South.
 Team North.
 Merge.
 Separated. 
 Eliminated.

External links

Robinson Ekspeditionen seasons
2013 Danish television seasons
Danish reality television series